Filippa Wallen (born 21 January 2000) is a Swedish professional footballer who plays as a defender for IF Brommapojkarna in the Damallsvenskan. She previously played for IF Brommapojkarna and AIK in Sweden. Wallen represented Sweden on the under-17 national team.

Playing career

Club
In January 2020, Wallen signed with West Ham United for the 2019–20 FA WSL season. Of the signing, manager Matt Beard noted, "Filippa is a talented and pacey full-back who has already shown her quality, despite her young age, in Swedish football."

International
Wallen represented Sweden on the under-17 national team.

References

External links
 
 West Ham United player profile
 Sweden player profile 

2000 births
Living people
Swedish women's footballers
Damallsvenskan players
West Ham United F.C. Women players
IF Brommapojkarna players
AIK Fotboll (women) players
Women's association football midfielders
Swedish expatriate women's footballers
Swedish expatriate sportspeople in England
Expatriate women's footballers in England
Apollon Ladies F.C. players
Expatriate women's footballers in Cyprus
Swedish expatriate sportspeople in Cyprus